Mohammed Eissa al-Muadab (Arabic: محمد عيسى المؤدب) is a Tunisian writer. He was born in 1966. 

His books include: 
 Wedding of Fire (short stories, 1995), winner of the Tunisian National Short Story Prize 
 Which Woman Am I? (short stories, 2013)
 Soft Jihad (novel, 2017), winner of the 2017 Tunisian Golden Comar Prize 
 Hammam Dhahab ("Bath of Gold," novel, 2019), nominated for the Arabic Booker Prize

References

Tunisian writers
20th-century Tunisian writers
21st-century Tunisian writers
1966 births
Living people